Ricardo Sanz García (1898–1986) was a leader of the Confederación Nacional del Trabajo (CNT) during the Spanish Civil War. He led the Durruti Column following the death of its namesake.

Early life and career 

Ricardo Sanz García was born in Valencia in 1898. In 1916, he moved to Barcelona, where he worked in textiles, joined the Confederación Nacional del Trabajo (CNT) labor union, and was imprisoned for two years. Sanz joined the anarchist action group Los Solidarios. To avoid detainment, Sanz went to France, where he smuggled weapons. During the 1930s Second Spanish Republic, Sanz joined the Federación Anarquista Ibérica (FAI) and became a CNT leader within Catalonia. He organized the CNT militias at the start of the Spanish Civil War. In November 1936, following Buenaventura Durruti's death, his former assistant Sanz came to lead the Durruti Column after Juan García Oliver declined. After failing to capture Zaragoza, Sanz was interned in French and Algerian concentration camps. He lived the remainder of his life in France, where he wrote two memoirs. Sanz died in 1986.

Works 

 Los que fuimos a Madrid: Columna Durruti (1969)
 Figuras de la revolución española (1972)

References

Bibliography

Further reading 

 
 

1898 births
1986 deaths
People from Valencia
Anarchist partisans
Confederación Nacional del Trabajo members
Spanish anarchists
Spanish military personnel of the Spanish Civil War (Republican faction)